Karak was the mascot for the 2006 Commonwealth Games. He was modelled on a red-tailed black cockatoo, a threatened species within the host country, Australia.

His biography, according to Commonwealth Games organisers:
Comes from a long line of squawkers. His Mum nested at an early age and foraged for the family. His Gran was famous in the area for her seed cakes. He has two brothers who were well-known badminton shuttlecocks, and a sister who passed her school exams with flying colours!
Four years at Treetops College studying Australian Endangered Species. Ran the Uni Sports Society. Apparently egged the principal's car during Orientation Week but nothing's ever been proven.

Despite his initial acceptance by Australians, particularly children, and despite appearing on a lot of the foreign made merchandise, Karak was noticeably absent from the Games, particularly the Opening and Closing Ceremonies, where he was inexplicably replaced by a white duck.

See also

List of Australian sporting mascots
List of Commonwealth Games mascots
Borobi (mascot)
Clyde (mascot)
Matilda (mascot)
Shera (mascot)

References

Sports mascots
Mascot
Bird mascots
Fictional birds
Australian mascots
Commonwealth Games mascots
Fictional people from Victoria (Australia)